Fiorina is a curacy (it: curazia) located in San Marino. It belongs to the municipality (castello) of Domagnano and it is its most populated parish (curazia).

Geography
The village is situated in the north of Domagnano, close to the municipality of Serravalle.

See also
Domagnano
Cà Giannino
Piandivello
Spaccio Giannoni
Torraccia

Curazie in San Marino
Domagnano